Edward Meyers McCreight is an American computer scientist.  He received his Ph.D. in computer science from Carnegie Mellon University in 1969, advised by Albert R. Meyer. He co-invented the B-tree with Rudolf Bayer while at Boeing,
and improved Weiner's algorithm to compute the suffix tree of a string. He also co-designed the Xerox Alto workstation,
and, with Severo Ornstein, co-led the design and construction of the Xerox Dorado computer while at Xerox Palo Alto Research Center.  He also worked at Adobe Systems.

Notes

External links
 Edward McCreight's website

Computer science educators
American computer scientists
Database researchers
Year of birth missing (living people)
Living people
Scientists at PARC (company)